Sir Maurice Linford Gwyer,  (25 April 1878 – 12 October 1952) was a British lawyer, judge, and academic administrator. He served as Vice-Chancellor of Delhi University from 1938 to 1950, and Chief Justice of India from 1937 to 1943). He is credited with having founded the college Miranda House in 1948 in Delhi, India. Gwyer Hall, the oldest men residence for the university students is named after him.

Biography
Gwyer was born to John Edward Gwyer and Edith Gwyer (née Linford), and he had a sister, Barbara Gwyer. He was educated at Highgate School from 1887 to 1892, then at Westminster School, before he graduated with a BA from Christ Church, Oxford. In November 1902 he was elected a Fellow of All Souls College, Oxford.

He was appointed CB (1921), KCB (1928), KCSI (1935), and GCIE (1948). He became an honorary student of Christ Church (1937), an honorary DCL of Oxford (1939), LLD of Travancore (1943) and Patna (1944), and DLitt of Delhi (1950).

He died at his home, 14 Kepplestone, Eastbourne, Sussex, on 12 October 1952, and was buried at St Marylebone cemetery, East Finchley, on 17 October.

References

Further reading
Records on Sir Maurice Gwyer are available in the British Library, Asia, Pacific and Africa Collections (previously Oriental and India Office Library) – papers (0304/09)

External links
Douglas Veale, ‘Gwyer, Sir Maurice Linford (1878–1952)’, rev. S. M. Cretney, Oxford Dictionary of National Biography, Oxford University Press, 2004; online edn, May 2006. Retrieved 11 January 2008

 

1878 births
1952 deaths
People educated at Highgate School
British India judges
Knights Commander of the Order of the Star of India
Knights Commander of the Order of the Bath
Knights Grand Commander of the Order of the Indian Empire
Vice-Chancellors of the University of Delhi